SH2 domain–containing protein 1A is a protein that in humans is encoded by the SH2D1A gene. It is often called SLAM-associated protein (symbol SAP), where "SLAM" refers to signaling lymphocytic activation molecules. It is a SH2 domain–containing molecule (part of a family of such molecules) that plays a role in SLAM signaling. A putative function is as an adaptor for Fyn and competitor of phosphatases, leading to modulation of SLAM family function. SAP has been implicated in autoimmunity, and a mutation of it is associated with X-linked lymphoproliferative disease. At least 32 disease-causing mutations in this gene have been discovered.

Interactions 

SH2D1A has been shown to interact with:
 CD84, 
 DOK1,
 FYN, 
 LY9 and
 SLAMF1.

References

Further reading

Ex